Life in Colour is the third studio album by English singer-songwriter Andreya Triana. The album was released on 24 May 2019 by Hi-Tea Records. It is Triana's first album release in four years, following her previous album Giants (2015). The album created three singles: "Woman", "Broke" and "Freedom". Triana collaborated with multiple producers for Life in Colour, notably French musician Dimitri Tikovoï who produced the majority of the album.

Track listing

References

External links
 

2019 albums
Andreya Triana albums